NGC 1326 is a lenticular galaxy in the constellation Fornax, 63 million light-years away. It was discovered by English astronomer John Herschel on 29 November 1837. It is a member of the Fornax Cluster, an NGC 1316 subgroup and has a diameter of 70 000 light-years.

NGC 1326 is an early-type lenticular galaxy with a Hubble classification of S0, but it is very different from other early-type lenticulars in the Fornax Cluster. NGC 1326 has a nuclear ring.

References

External links
 

Fornax (constellation)
Discoveries by John Herschel
Astronomical objects discovered in 1837
Lenticular galaxies
1326